Fin Island is an island in the North Coast region of British Columbia, Canada, located to the northwest of Gil Island between Cridge and Lewis Passages.

(4.0 acres). It is one of the many reserves of the Hartley Bay Indian Band of the Gitga'ata group of Tsimshian.

See also
List of islands of British Columbia
List of Indian reserves in British Columbia

References

Islands of British Columbia
North Coast of British Columbia